Win Nyunt (Burmese:ဝင်းညွန့် , born 1 October 1963) is a Burmese politician who currently serves as a Minister of ministry of Road Transports and electricity in Kachin State Government and an MP of Kachin State Hluttaw for Waingmaw township from 2015 election. He is a member of the National League for Democracy.

Early life and education 
Win Nyunt was born on 1 October 1963 in Bhamo, Kachin State, Myanmar. He Graduated high school from Basic Education High School No. 1 Bhamo. He graduated with a B.E. electronic from Yangon Technological University.

Political career 
He is a member of the National League for Democracy. In the 2015 Myanmar general election, he was elected as a Kachin State Hluttaw MP, winning a majority of 6007 votes and elected representative from Waingmaw Township parliamentary constituency. By the order of President of Myanmar (Win Myint) and he become a Minister of Kachin State Government.

References

External links 
 https://www.facebook.com/win.nyunt.777

National League for Democracy politicians
1963 births
Kachin State
People from Kachin State
Living people